Karl von Wogau was born 18 July 1941 in Freiburg and is a German politician. Karl von Wogau studied Law and Economics in Freiburg, Munich and Bonn and holds a Doctorate on the constitutional history of Further Austria (German: Vorderösterreich).

Karl von Wogau is a member of the German conservative party Christian Democratic Union and the European People's Party. From 1979 to 2008 he served as an elected Member of the European Parliament for the Land (federal state) Baden-Württemberg and was the chairman of the Committee on Economic and Monetary Affairs from 1994 to 1999. From 2004 to 2009, he was chairman of the Subcommittee on Security and Defence of the Committee on Foreign Affairs.

In 2009, Wogau was defeated in his bid for a seventh term in the European Parliament. He is now Secretary General of the European Security Foundation.

References

MEPs for Germany 1979–1984
MEPs for Germany 1984–1989
MEPs for Germany 1989–1994
MEPs for Germany 1994–1999
MEPs for Germany 1999–2004
MEPs for Germany 2004–2009
Living people
Christian Democratic Union of Germany MEPs
Officers Crosses of the Order of Merit of the Federal Republic of Germany
Recipients of the Order of Merit of Baden-Württemberg
Year of birth missing (living people)